The Rubens River is a river located in southern Patagonia. The river originates in Chile's Cordillera Aníbal Pinto in the southwest and flows northeast into Argentina where it joins Penitente River. Sources disagree whether Rubens River is tributary of Penitentes river or whether Gallegos River originate at their confluence.

References 

Rivers of Argentina
Rivers of Chile
Rivers of Magallanes Region
International rivers of South America
Rivers of Santa Cruz Province, Argentina